Samuel Botsford Buckley (May 9, 1809 – February 18, 1884) was an American botanist, geologist, and naturalist. He graduated from Wesleyan University in 1836.

Buckley investigated the botany of the southern United States and discovered many new species of plants and mollusks. The plant genus Buckleya was named in his honor. He also was the state geologist of Texas (1860–1861); determined the height of Mount Buckley in the Great Smoky Mountains (named in his honor), in North Carolina, and several other summits; and was the scientific editor of the State Gazette in Austin, Texas (1871-1872). He wrote numerous scientific papers and a book on the trees and shrubs of the United States.

References

Wesleyan University alumni
American naturalists
American botanists
People from Yates County, New York
1809 births
1884 deaths
Scientists from New York (state)